Veera Santhanam was an Indian painter, activist, and actor.

Career 
He graduated from Kumbakonam Arts College and his paintings are inspired by murals and everyday life in Chennai. As an activist, he supported Sri Lankan Tamil nationalism during the civil war in the country. He also acted in several films including the Tamil film Kaththi (2014). He played the lead role in Gnanaserukku (2020) won several international awards in world film festival, directed by the independent filmmaker Dharani Rajendran. He won Best Actor award at Five Continents International Film Festival, Venezuela.

Notable artworks 
Mullivaikal Muttram

Filmography 
All films are in Tamil.

Death 
He died on 13 July 2017 at age 71. He died four days after dubbing for his role in  Gnanaserukku, which is yet to be release.

References

External links 

2017 deaths
Indian painters
Indian activists
Indian male film actors
Tamil male actors
Male actors from Tamil Nadu
21st-century Indian male actors
Male actors in Tamil cinema